The 2003 Supercupa României was the 7th edition of Romania's season opener cup competition. The match was played in Bucharest at Stadionul Naţional on 2 August 2003, and was contested between Divizia A title holders, Rapid and Cupa României champions, Dinamo. Rapid won the trophy in extra time after a golden goal by substitute Robert Niţă.

Match

Details

References

External links
Romania - List of Super Cup Finals, RSSSF.com

Supercupa Romaniei, 2003
2003
Supercupa României
2003